M105 or M-105 may refer to:

 Messier 105, an elliptical galaxy in the constellation Leo
 M105, a 1½ ton US Army trailer
 M-105 (Michigan highway), a former state highway in Michigan
 Klimov M-105 aircraft engine
 WWWM, a radio station in Cleveland, Ohio now known as WMJI

In athletics:
 Masters athletics, an age group for athletes aged 35+

nl:M105